The 1851 Massachusetts gubernatorial election was held on November 10.

Incumbent Democratic Governor George S. Boutwell was re-elected to a second term in office. Although Whig Robert C. Winthrop won a plurality of the popular vote, a majority was required for election. Instead, the election was put to the Massachusetts General Court, where a coalition of Free Soil and Democratic legislators elected Boutwell to a second term.

Background

After winning the 1850 elections, the Democratic-Free Soil coalition elected Charles Sumner to the U.S. Senate despite drawn-out resistance from conservative Democrats. In addition to substantive banking and corporate reform, the legislature introduced the Australian ballot to state elections. A secret ballot was a major blow to the Whigs, who relied on the open ballot to pressure factory employees to vote the party line. However, the more conservative faction of the Free Soilers blocked a legislative reapportionment plan which would have increased representation for coalition's base of small towns and a plan to move the capital from Whig-dominated Boston to Worcester.

General election

Candidates
George S. Boutwell, incumbent Governor (Democratic)
Francis Cogswell (Independent)
Robert C. Winthrop, former U.S. Senator and Speaker of the U.S. House (Whig)
John G. Palfrey, former U.S. Representative from Cambridge (Free Soil)

Campaign
With the state still split in a three-way plurality and following the clear emergence of the Democratic-Free Soil coalition of 1850, both the Whig and Coalition forces focused on securing a majority in the General Court. 

The primary policy issue in the campaign was the coalition effort for a ten-hour workday. Whigs opposed the measure on as a threat to both economic efficiency and social mobility, arguing that labor regulation prevented motivated employees from contracting for more hours, accumulating capital, and reinvesting for themselves. Though some suggested emphasizing national issues instead to divide the coalition forces, the Whigs settled on a campaign led by Senator John W. Davis on state issues.

The ten-hour debate came to a head in Lowell, a city more dependent on factory labor than any other. Despite the city's traditional domination by textile industrialists and the Whig Party, the coalition ticket headed by attorney Benjamin Butler campaigned explicitly in favor of the ten-hour day. With the secret ballot allowing workers to cast votes without their employer's knowledge, the ticket won a surprising upset in the usually-Whig city on election day. However, the Whig city government found irregularities in the returns and declared a new election. With the legislature split evenly between the coalition and Whig forces, the Lowell election would decide control of state government.

As the Lowell run-off election intensified, Whig industrialists like Linus Child returned to old tactics, including threatening any employee who voted the Butler ticket with termination. At a rally in response, Butler told the crowd, “I am here to serve you and to save you from bondage" and openly threatened to light the city on fire if a single vote were bribed or coerced:

As God lives and I live, by the living Jehovah! if one man is driven from his employment by these men because of his vote, I will lead you to make Lowell what it was twenty-five years ago,—a sheep pasture and a fishing place; and I will commence by applying the torch to my own house. Let them come on. As we are not the aggressors, we seek not this awful contest.

The Butler ticket won the late election, securing a General Court majority for the coalition and raising Senator-elect Butler's statewide profile.

Results

Legislative vote
The Massachusetts House of Representatives certified the popular returns on January 12. Governor Boutwell was the first candidate nominated with 200 votes to Winthrop's 194. On a second ballot, Winthrop was nominated with 240 votes, with 30 for Palfrey and 16 for Cogswell. In the Massachusetts State Senate, Boutwell defeated Winthrop 28–11.

Aftermath
In response to Child's threat in the Lowell election, the new legislature passed a law making it a crime to bribe or coerce voters.

See also
 1851 Massachusetts legislature

References

Bibliography

Governor
1851
Massachusetts
November 1851 events